Buenos Aires is a city located in the state of Pernambuco, Brazil. Located 78 km from the state capital of Recife, it has an estimated (IBGE 2020) population of 13,190 people.

Geography
 State - Pernambuco
 Region - Zona da mata Pernambucana (Coastal zone)
 Boundaries - Vicência    (N);  Carpina   (S);  Limoeiro   (W); Nazaré da Mata   (E)
 Area - 96.69 km2
 Elevation - 149 m
 Drainage basin - Goiana River
 Vegetation - Subcaducifólia forest
 Climate - Hot tropical and humid
 Annual average temperature - 23.1 °C
 Distance to Recife - 78 km

Economy

The main economic activities in Buenos Aires are based in industry, commerce and agribusiness, especially sugarcane, bananas; and livestock such as poultry and cattle.

Economic indicators

Economy by Sector (as of 2013)

Health indicators

References

Municipalities in Pernambuco